Mobilinux is a discontinued Linux distribution by MontaVista. It was announced on April 25, 2005.

History 
In 2005, PalmSource joined MontaVista to collaborate on Mobilinux.

In April 2005, version 4.0 was released. In 2007, version 5.0 was released.

Usage 
Around 35 million devices have run on Mobilinux, mainly in Asian markets. LWN.net argued that because it was controlled by a single company and targeted mobile operators, it did not generated a large developer community. It has been used on smartphones and NAS devices. The Motorola ROKR ran Mobilinux.

Hardware support 
It had support for the Freescale's i.MX31 chipset.

See also 

 OpenEZX

References 

Embedded Linux distributions
Mobile Linux
Linux distributions